Geraldine's First Year is a 1922 British silent comedy film directed by George A. Cooper and starring Betty Farquhar, Sydney Folker and Joan McLean.

Cast
 Betty Farquhar as The Maid  
 Sydney Folker as Jim Cunninghame  
 L. March as Mrs. Venable  
 Joan McLean as Geraldine

References

Bibliography
 Murphy, Robert. Directors in British and Irish Cinema: A Reference Companion. British Film Institute, 2006.

External links

1922 films
British silent short films
British comedy films
Films directed by George A. Cooper
British black-and-white films
1922 comedy films
1920s English-language films
1920s British films
Silent comedy films